Michael Allen (January 19, 1976 – April 20, 2008), better known as VL Mike, was an American rapper from New Orleans, Louisiana.

Music career 
He first appeared on the mainstream rap scene in 2004 as a member of the New Orleans-based record label, Chopper City Records, of which rapper B.G. is the CEO. Mike was known for his gangsta rhyme structure and street lyrics throughout New Orleans. After the 2007 release of the Chopper City Boyz' debut album We Got This, VL Mike departed from Chopper City Records and set out to pursue his solo career. VL Mike stated on his Place Yo Betz mixtape that the reason he departed from the label because B.G. had been portraying himself as a gangster for years through his music when he was not. VL Mike stated in an interview that he had a deal with Sony/Epic Records and his debut album, It's Only One Me, would be released in April.

Death 
Allen died on April 20, 2008, after he was shot several times while exiting his vehicle on the 4700 block of Miles Drive at around 1:00 p.m. He was later pronounced dead at University Hospital.

Discography

Albums
2007: We Got This (with Chopper City Boyz)

Mixtapes
2007: Place Yo Betz (mixed by DJ Perv, hosted by Ziggla Da Wiggla)
2016: I'm the Truth (mixed by DJ Hektik, hosted by Ziggla Da Wiggla)

Solo singles
2008: "Money in Here" (featuring Mannie Fresh)

See also
 List of murdered hip hop musicians
 List of unsolved murders

References

External links
 VL Mike on Myspace

1976 births
2008 deaths
2008 murders in the United States
African-American male rappers
Deaths by firearm in Louisiana
Gangsta rappers
Male murder victims
Murdered African-American people
American murder victims
People murdered in Louisiana
Rappers from New Orleans
Unsolved murders in the United States
20th-century American male musicians
20th-century African-American musicians
21st-century African-American people